This is a list of '''election results for the Electoral district of Hart in South Australian elections.

Members for Hart

Election results

Elections in the 1990s 

 Hart is the new name of the abolished district of Semaphore, which was held by Independent Labor MP Norm Peterson, who contested the Legislative Council.

References

South Australian state electoral results by district